Voith-Arena (formerly GAGFAH-Arena, Albstadion) is a multi-use stadium in Heidenheim, Germany.  It is currently used for football matches and is the home stadium of 1. FC Heidenheim.  The stadium has a capacity of 15,000 people after its most recent expansion.

References

Football venues in Germany
Buildings and structures in Heidenheim (district)
Sports venues in Baden-Württemberg
1. FC Heidenheim